Gruda may refer to:

Places
 Gruda, Croatia, a village in Konavle Municipality, Croatia
 Gruda, Danilovgrad, a village in Danilovgrad Municipality, Montenegro
 Gruda, Bartoszyce County, a village in Bartoszyce County, Poland
 Gruda, Ostróda County, a village in Ostróda County, Poland
 Grudë, Albania, a village in Gruemirë Municipality, Albania
 Gruda (region), a region and historic Albanian tribe
 Grūda (lake), a lake between Lithuania and Belarus border
 Grūda (river), a river in south Lithuania.

People
Gruda (surname), list of people with the surname
Gruda (tribe), Northern Albanian tribe